The 2016 Jiffy Lube Alberta Scotties Tournament of Hearts, Alberta's provincial women's curling championship, was held from January 20 to 24 at the North Hill Curling Club in Calgary. The winning Chelsea Carey team represented Alberta at the 2016 Scotties Tournament of Hearts in Grande Prairie.

Teams
The teams are listed as follows:

Knockout Draw Brackets
The draw is listed as follows:

A Event

B Event

C Event

Playoffs

A vs B
Saturday, January 23, 6:30pm

C1 vs C2
Saturday, January 23, 6:30pm

Semifinal
Sunday, January 24, 9:30am

Final
Sunday, January 24, 2:00 pm

References

Curling in Alberta
2016 Scotties Tournament of Hearts
Sport in Calgary
2016 in Alberta